Meeresstille und glückliche Fahrt can refer to:

 Meeresstille und glückliche Fahrt (Beethoven), a cantata by Ludwig van Beethoven
 Meeresstille und glückliche Fahrt (Mendelssohn), a concert overture by Felix Mendelssohn